Ahmmon Richards (born May 20, 1998) is a former American football wide receiver. His career came to an end after sustaining a neck injury in the first game of the 2018 season. Richards was projected as a first-round pick by multiple NFL scouts.

Early years
Richards attended Wellington High School in Wellington, Florida. During his career he had 144 receptions for 2,722 yards and 39 touchdowns. He committed to the University of Miami to play college football.

College career
Richards played in all 13 games and made 11 starts as a true freshman at Miami in 2016. He finished the season with 934 receiving yards, which broke Michael Irvin's school record for receiving yards by a freshman. He was second on the team with 49 receptions and three touchdowns.

On October 6, 2018, it was announced that Richards' playing career had come to an end due to a disabling neck injury he suffered during the first game of the season. “I’m extremely appreciative of the University’s athletic training and medical staffs for diagnosing this injury, and to the football coaches and staff for always putting my health first,” Richards said in the release. “I plan to continue working towards my degree at UM and look forward to the next chapter in my life.”

References

External links
Miami Hurricanes bio

Living people
1998 births
American football wide receivers
Miami Hurricanes football players
People from Wellington, Florida
Players of American football from Florida
Sportspeople from the Miami metropolitan area